Kyla (The Queen of R&B) is the tenth studio album of Filipino R&B singer Kyla, released on April 15, 2018, by Star Music. It is Kyla's first album with Star Music after 16 years with  PolyEast Records / EMI Philippines.

The album became #1 selling album on iTunes Philippines less than a day after its release and was sold out at the album launch on April 15.

Background and development
Upon signing with Star Music in December 2016, it was announced that she will release an album in the third quarter of 2017, but was delayed a few times. Executive producer Jonathan Manalo shared that the concept was a throwback to 90's R&B. The label first intended to release an extended play.

The album is composed mostly of R&B ballads and soul with the a few upbeat and mid-tempo tracks. Kyla included one cover in the album, South Border's "Sa'yo" featuring its songwriter Jay Durias. It also contains four bonus tracks, which are previously recorded but unreleased songs by Kyla: her theme song renditions of "Till I Met You" and "On The Wings Of Love" and her Himig Handog interpretations of "Monumento" and "Tayo Na Lang Kasi."

On January 15, 2018, Star Music announced that Kyla will have double-lead singles with a full-length album release in March 2018. The first lead single, "Only Gonna Love You," was released on January 19, while the second lead single, "Fix You And Me" was released on February 2. Her album release was again delayed from March 17, 2018, to April due to "health reasons."

Singles
 "Only Gonna Love You," an urban, pop-reggaeton track, was released as the album's first lead single on January 19, 2018, and features international rapper REQ. Kyla performed the single at ASAP on March 25, 2018. The music video was directed by John Prats and Brightbulb production.
 "Fix You and Me" was released on February 2, 2018, two weeks after the first lead single. The music video is a sequel to "Only Gonna Love You."
 "Talk About Us" (feat. Iñigo Pascual) was released on June 8, 2018, at Monster RX 93.1 as the third single.
 "Mahal Kita Pero Konti Na Lang," due to its popularity, was released on July 18, 2018, at MOR 101.9 as the fourth single.

Track listing

Release history

References

2018 albums
Kyla albums